The 20 kilometre cross-country skiing event was part of the cross-country skiing programme for women at the 1984 Winter Olympics, in Sarajevo, Yugoslavia. It was the first time the event took place at the Olympics. The competition was held on Saturday, February 18, 1984 at Veliko Polje, Igman.

Marja-Liisa Hämäläinen of Finland won gold to leave Sarajevo with gold medals in all three individual events.

Results

References

External links
Official Olympic Report

Women's cross-country skiing at the 1984 Winter Olympics
Women's 20 kilometre cross-country skiing at the Winter Olympics
Oly
Cross